Calvin Louis Petersen (born October 19, 1994) is an American professional ice hockey goaltender for the Ontario Reign of the American Hockey League (AHL) while under contract to the Los Angeles Kings of the National Hockey League (NHL). He was selected in the fifth round, 129th overall by the Buffalo Sabres in the 2013 NHL Entry Draft. On July 1, 2017, he signed a two-year entry-level contract with the Kings as an unrestricted free agent.

Prior to turning professional, Petersen played college ice hockey for the University of Notre Dame. He set a NCAA Division I record of 87 saves during the longest collegiate ice hockey game ever. Petersen was named to the All-Rookie Team and First All-Star Team while at Notre Dame.

Playing career
Petersen attended Waterloo West High School in Waterloo, Iowa. While in high school, he played junior ice hockey with the Topeka RoadRunners of the North American Hockey League (NAHL) and the Waterloo Black Hawks of the United States Hockey League (USHL). After the 2012–13 season, he was drafted in the 2013 NHL Entry Draft by the Buffalo Sabres. Petersen decided to attend university instead of turning professional immediately and played three seasons at the University of Notre Dame.

In his freshman season with Notre Dame, Petersen played in 33 games and posted a 13–16–3 record. He helped lead Notre Dame to the Hockey East playoffs, playing in all six games. On March 6, 2015, during first game of the Hockey East playoffs, Petersen set a Division 1 record 87 saves while playing in the longest collegiate hockey game against the UMass Minutemen. The game lasted five overtimes and ended in a 4–3 overtime loss. Notre Dame later lost in the quarterfinals to UMass Lowell. At the conclusion of the season, Petersen was named to the Hockey East All-Rookie Team and to the 2015 Hockey East All-Academic Team.

In his sophomore season, Petersen started in all 37 games of the season, posting a 19–11–7 record. As a result, Petersen was named a Honorable Mention Hockey East All-Star. He was also named a finalist for the 2016 Mike Richter Award as the most outstanding goaltender in NCAA men's ice hockey and named team's most valuable player.

In his junior year, Petersen was named team captain and led his team to the 2017 Frozen Four where they lost 6–1 to the Denver Pioneers. At the conclusion of the season, Petersen was named to the Hockey East First-Team All-Stars and again named one of the finalists for the 2017 Mike Richter Award. 

On May 31, 2017, Petersen announced he was forgoing his final year of college eligibility, giving the Sabres 30 days to sign him before he became a free agent. Negotiations failed with the Sabres and he became a free agent. On July 1, 2017, he signed a two-year, entry-level contract with the Los Angeles Kings as an unrestricted free agent.

Professional
Petersen began the 2018–19 season with the Ontario Reign after being cut from the Kings training camp. On November 12, 2018, he was recalled from the Reign after Jack Campbell suffered a torn meniscus. Petersen made his NHL debut the following night against the Toronto Maple Leafs, coming in to relieve starter Peter Budaj in the second period. The Kings lost 5–1 to the Maple Leafs with Petersen saving 15 shots and allowing one goal. The following game, on November 16, Petersen earned his first NHL start in the United Center against the Chicago Blackhawks, and recorded his first NHL win that night in a 2–1 shootout, making 34 saves in total. Two games later, on November 19, Petersen recorded his first career NHL shutout by making 29 saves in a 2–0 win over the St. Louis Blues.

On July 16, 2019, Petersen signed a three-year contract extension with the Kings. He then began the 2019–20 season with the Reign. On January 3, 2020, Petersen was named to the AHL 2020 All-Star Game.

On September 22, 2021, Petersen signed a three-year, $15 million contract extension with the Kings.

Personal life
Petersen's father, Eric, was also a goaltender. He played Division III hockey at Bethel University in Minnesota.

Career statistics

Regular season and playoffs

International

Awards and honours

References

External links
 

1994 births
Living people
American men's ice hockey goaltenders
Buffalo Sabres draft picks
Ice hockey people from Iowa
Los Angeles Kings players
Notre Dame Fighting Irish men's ice hockey players
Ontario Reign (AHL) players
People from Waterloo, Iowa
Waterloo Black Hawks players